Ray Hallor (January 11, 1900 – April 16, 1944) was an actor in films in the United States.

Biography
Born in Washington, D.C., actresses Edith Hallor (1896–1971) and Ethel Hallor (1992–1982) were his siblings. 

Hallor began working in films with Edison Studios in 1915. He starred in the 1927 film Driven from Home. He also acted on stage in a Gus Edwards revue.

He was killed in a head-on automobile collision in Palm Springs, California, on April 16, 1944.

Partial filmography

Kidnapped (1917)
An Amateur Orphan (1917)
Blackbirds (1920) credited as assistant director
The Dangerous Maid (1923)
The Circus Cowboy (1924)
Learning to Love (1925)
Sally (1925)
Storm Breaker (1925)
The Last Edition (1925)
Red Dice (1926)
 The High Flyer (1926)
It Must Be Love (1926)
Driven from Home (1927)
Man Crazy (1927)
The Haunted Ship (1927)
 Tongues of Scandal (1927)
 Quarantined Rivals (1927)
Nameless Men (1928)
The Trail of '98 (1928)
The Avenging Shadow (1928)
Thundergod (1928)
Green Grass Widows (1928)
 Manhattan Knights (1928)
Black Butterflies (1928)
Tropical Nights (1928)
The Black Pearl (1928)
 Noisy Neighbors (1929)
In Old California  (1929)   	
Circumstantial Evidence (1929)
Fast Life (1929)
Hidden Valley (1932)

Further reading
Ray Hallow Signed, Motion Picture World January 16, 1926, page 241

References

External links

1900 births
1944 deaths
20th-century American male actors
American male film actors
Road incident deaths in California